The Nashville Predators are a professional ice hockey team based in Nashville, Tennessee. They are members of the Central Division of the Western Conference of the National Hockey League (NHL). The team was founded as an expansion franchise in 1997, and played their first game during the 1998–1999 season. At the end of the 2018–19 season, 280 players, 17 goaltenders and 263 skaters (forwards and defenseman), have played at least one game for Predators in the regular or post-season.

Key
  Appeared in a Predators game during the 2020–21 season.

The "Seasons" column lists the first year of the season of the player's first game and the last year of the season of the player's last game. For example, a player who played one game in the 2000–2001 season would be listed as playing with the team from 2000–2001, regardless of what calendar year the game occurred within.

Statistics complete as of the 2020–2021 NHL season.

Goaltenders

Skaters

Notes
a: As of the 2005–06 season, all games have a winner; teams losing in overtime and shootouts are awarded one point thus the OTL stat replacees the tie statistic. The OTL column also includes SOL (Shootout losses).

References
General
Nashville Predators website

Specific

Nashville Predators

players